Remark may refer to:

 Remark Media, a digital media and social media company
 Erich Paul Remark (1898–1970) a.k.a. Erich Maria Remarque, a German novelist

See also
 
 Comment (disambiguation)